Paktofonika was a Polish hip hop group from Katowice and Mikołów, which debuted with the album Kinematografia in 2000. The name Paktofonika comes from the words pakt (pact) and fonika (phonics), from which derives the idea of "A pact made alongside sounds from a speaker", created by band's founders, Magik and Rahim.

A film inspired by its story, titled Jesteś Bogiem and directed by Leszek Dawid, was released in May 2012. It became a box-office hit and the highest-selling Polish film of the year. It also won several film awards.

Members
 Piotr "Magik" Łuszcz (1978–2000) – formerly of Kaliber 44
 Wojciech "Fokus" Alszer (born 1980) – ex Kwadrat Skład, since 2004 a member of Pokahontaz 
 Sebastian "Rahim" Salbert (born 1978) – ex 3xKlan, Erka, since 2004 a member of Pokahontaz

History

Formation (1998-1999)
Paktofonika began when Magik left Kaliber 44 during the recording of their second album, W 63 minuty dookoła świata (1998). Rahim left his group 3xKlan at around the same time, and formed Paktofonika with Magik and Fokus in 1998. Their first songs, written in October 1998, were "Priorytety", "Ja to Ja" and "Gdyby". Two new members joined Paktofonika, DJ Bambus on turntables, and Sot as a beatboxer.

Kinematografia and Magik's death (2000)
In the spring of 2000, the group signed a contract with Gigant Records. In the summer of that year, the group was in Witten, Germany, where they recorded their song "2 Kilo" with German artists. On 18 December 2000, Paktofonika's first album entitled Kinematografia was released. Eight days later, on 26 December at 6.15 a.m., Magik committed suicide by jumping from the window of his ninth-floor big apartment.

Aftermath (2001-2003)
After Magik's death, the group continued performing with DJ Bambus and Sot for some time. In concerts, they were using previously recorded material of Magik's vocals. In May 2001, a sample of Paktofonika's song "Ja to Ja", sung by reggae/hip-hop artist Piotr 'Gutek' Gutkowski, was used in an ice-cream commercial without the group members' permission, but with the knowledge of Gigant Records.

In September 2002, Paktofonika's farewell album was released. Archiwum Kinematografii contained studio outtakes from the group's first album, and two songs recorded later without Magik, "Ja to ja 2 (dokładnie tak!)" and "W pełnej gotowości". In December 2002, it was announced that on 21 March 2003 the group would give its last performance under the name Paktofonika in Spodek, Katowice. The concert was recorded and released as Pożegnalny koncert on 26 April 2004 through Universal Music Poland.

Rahim and Fokus continue to work on other projects, such as PFK Company and Pokahontaz.

Legacy
Jesteś Bogiem, a long-awaited film inspired by Paktofonika's story and directed by Leszek Dawid, was released on 7 May 2012. It received critical acclaim and won several awards, including two Polish Film Awards (out of ten nominations) and 6 Złote Lwy awards (out of 7 nominations) at Gdynia Film Festival. The film was also a box-office hit, with 1,366,293 viewers within its first month in theaters, and became the highest-selling Polish film of the year. The film title (You are God) refers to the title of Paktofonika's most popular song, "Jestem Bogiem" ("I am God").

Discography

Studio albums

Extended plays

Live albums

Other releases

References

1998 establishments in Poland
Musical groups established in 1998
Musicians from Katowice
Polish hip hop groups